David Harris (19 December 1930 – 8 August 2007) was an Australian cricketer. He played in twenty-five first-class matches for South Australia between 1953 and 1960.

See also
 List of South Australian representative cricketers

References

External links
 

1930 births
2007 deaths
Australian cricketers
South Australia cricketers
Cricketers from Adelaide